also known as Kuroda Souen, was a samurai during the sengoku period He was the father of Kuroda Kanbei.  Shigetaka served as a senior retainer of Kodera Masamoto, the lord of Himeji.

Family
 Father: Kuroda Shigetaka (1508–1564)
 Mother: Matsutaka Zen’ni
 Wives: 
 Akashi Masakaze's daughter (1532-1560)
 Kanki-dono (d.1582)
 Concubine: Mori-dono
 Children:
 Kuroda Yoshitaka by Akashi Masakaze's daughter
 Kuroda Toshitaka (1554-1596) by Akashi Masakaze's daughter
 Kaneyama Myoshun (1555-1626) married Miki Seikan by Akashi Masakaze's daughter
 Akiyama Myoen (1556-1619) married Onoue Takenori by Akashi Masakaze's daughter
 Kuroda Toshinori (1561-1612) by Kanki-dono
 Kuroda Naoyuki (1565-1609) by Mori-dono
 Daughter (1559-1617) married Hitotsuyanagi Naosue by Mori-dono

References

Samurai
1524 births
1585 deaths
Deified Japanese people